Sŭngho or Sŭngho-gun is a county of North Hwanghae Province, North Korea. It was formerly one of the 19 kuyŏk that constitute P'yŏngyang, but in 2010, it was administratively reassigned from P'yŏngyang to North Hwanghae; foreign media attributed the change as an attempt to relieve shortages in P'yŏngyang's food distribution system.

Administrative divisions
Sŭngho county is divided into 8 tong (neighbourhoods) and 6 ri (villages):

References 

Counties of North Hwanghae